The women's 63 kg weightlifting event was an event at the weightlifting competition, limiting competitors to a maximum of 63 kilograms of body mass. The whole competition took place on 7 October at 18:30. The event took  place at the Jawaharlal Nehru Stadium, Delhi.

Results

References

See also
 2010 Commonwealth Games
 Weightlifting at the 2010 Commonwealth Games

Weightlifting at the 2010 Commonwealth Games
Common